HAL  may refer to:

Aviation
 Halali Airport (IATA airport code: HAL) Halali, Oshikoto, Namibia
 Hawaiian Airlines (ICAO airline code: HAL)
 HAL Airport, Bangalore, India
 Hindustan Aeronautics Limited an Indian aerospace manufacturer of fighter aircraft and helicopters

Businesses
 HAL Allergy, a Dutch pharmaceutical company
 HAL Computer Systems, a defunct computer manufacturer
 HAL Laboratory, a Japanese video game developer
 Halliburton's New York Stock Exchange ticker symbol
 Hamburg America Line, a shipping company
 Hindustan Aeronautics Limited, an Indian aerospace manufacturer of fighter aircraft and helicopters
 Hindustan Antibiotics Limited, an Indian public sector pharmaceutical manufacturer
 Holland America Line, a cruise ship operator
 HAL FM, or CHNS-FM, a classic rock station in Halifax, Nova Scotia

Computing
 Hardware abstraction layer, a layer of software that hides hardware differences from higher level programs
 HAL (software), an implementation of a hardware abstraction layer for Unix-like systems
 HAL/S, the computer language used to program the Space Shuttle's computers
 HAL, a Lotus Development Corporation product released in 1986
 Hackers at Large, a Dutch hackers and security conference
 Hypertext Application Language, a standard convention for defining hypermedia such as links to external resources within JSON or XML code

Entertainment
 HAL 9000, a fictional computer in the Space Odyssey series
 Hal (Japanese band), a Japanese pop band
 Hal (Irish band), an Irish rock band
 H.A.L. (G.I. Joe), a fictional weapon in the G.I. Joe universe

Other
 HAL (automobile), a car built in Cleveland 1916-1918
 HAL (gene), which encodes the enzyme histidine ammonia-lyase
 HAL (open archive) (Hyper Articles en Ligne), a French online research open archive
 HAL (robot) (Hybrid Assistive Limb), a powered exoskeleton suit
 Het Amsterdams Lyceum, a Dutch secondary school
 Hindustan Aeronautics Limited SC, a football club in Bangalore, India
 Hyperspace Analogue to Language, a semantic memory model
 Hyundai A-League, an Australian professional association football league

See also
 Hal (disambiguation)
 Hot air leveling, surface finish in printed circuit boards manufacturing